LY-310762 is a drug which acts as a potent and selective antagonist for the 5-HT1D serotonin receptor, with reasonable selectivity over the closely related 5-HT1B subtype.

References

5-HT1 antagonists
Fluoroarenes
Piperidines
Indoles
Ketones